Pierre David Édouard de Colbert-Chabanais (Paris, 18 October 1774 – 1853) was a general of the French Revolutionary Wars and Napoleonic Wars, noted for his unbreakable loyalty to Napoleon.

Life

Revolution
Born into a noble family descended from the prestigious Colbert line, he was the son of the comte de Colbert, a rich landowner. On 23 August 1793, Pierre followed the traditional family route into the army, which was now the Republican army, although he was suspicious of the French Revolution. He fought in the 1793 campaigns in the Army of the Rhine, as a member of the bataillon de Paris, also known as the bataillon Guillaume-Tell after William Tell. He moved to the 11th Hussar Regiment, gaining promotion to maréchal-des-logis in September 1793 and to sous-lieutenant the following month.

After three years in the Army of the Rhine and in the armies suppressing the Vendéan Revolt, he was dismissed by Lazare Hoche in 1796. He left the 7th Hussars to become a commissaire des guerres to the armée d'Orient, with the job of guaranteeing Bonaparte's supply lines to Egypt. During that time Bonaparte took him under his wing.

First Empire
Returning to the army after Egypt, he was wounded and made a captain in the 3rd Dragoon Regiment, before finally rising to become aide-de-camp to Damas. He then became adjudant-major to the Mamelukes and aide-de-camp to Junot in 1803. He then followed Junot to become part of the armée des côtes.

Colbert left Junot in 1805 and followed major général Maréchal Berthier as his aide de camp. He assisted at Austerlitz, where he was wounded and made a chef d'escadron. He fought bravely at Iena and Pułtusk. In 1807 he was made a colonel and head of his old regiment, the 7th Hussars. This unit was now part of Lassalle's brigade, nicknamed the "infernal" brigade due to its passion. Napoleon made him a knight of the Légion d'honneur in 1808 and baron de Chabanais et de l'Empire in 1809

Colbert was promoted to général de brigade on 9 March 1809 and put under the orders of Oudinot. He won glory at the Battle of Raab by charging and defeating Ott's hussars, cutting several squadrons of the enemy Hungarian cavalry to pieces and nearly coming to the aid of the 9th Hussar Regiment, which the Austrians were on the point of overwhelming. At Wagram Colbert was shot in the head three times and was made a commander of the Légion d'honneur.

Attached to the Imperial Guard in 1811, he re-formed and commanded the 2e régiment de chevau-légers lanciers de la Garde impériale (better known as the Red Lancers, they were also nicknamed the écrevisses or crayfish, after their red uniforms). He also led the brigade for the whole of the Russian campaign under the orders of the duc d'Istrie. He and the Lancers then bravely covered the Grande Armée's retreat. During the German campaign of 1813 at Bautzen he broke and routed the Russians and cut them to pieces. On 25 November 1813 he was promoted to général de division during the retreat back through Germany .

1814–1817
General Colbert fought bravely at Montmirail, Champaubert and Nangis, but finally defected to the Bourbons, who made him a chevalier de Saint-Louis and commander of the lancers corps in the royal guard. On Napoleon's return, general Colbert dithered until 23 March 1815. When Colbert came to the Tuileries, Napoleon said to him icily "General Colbert, I've been waiting for you for three days", to which Colbert replied "I have been waiting for you for a year" and Napoleon put him in command of his personal guard. Colbert was wounded fighting at Waterloo and after the armée de la Loire was disbanded the Bourbons held a grudge against Colbert. He thus returned home, only for his loyalty to turn against him – in 1816 he was arrested without charge, held in the Prison de l'Abbaye for two months and exiled on his release. In 1817, however, he was recalled.

1826–1853
After ten years' inactivity, his military career only resumed in 1826. However, he had lost the brilliance he had shown during the Napoleonic Wars and instead became inspector general of cavalry and commander of a division of the camp de Lunéville. After the July Revolution in 1830, he was put in charge of disbanding the eight cavalry regiments of the former royal guard. In 1834, general Colbert became aide-de-camp to Prince Louis, Duke of Nemours, accompanying the prince to Africa and taking part in the first expedition to Constantine in 1836. He was made a peer of France in 1838 and Grand Cross of the Légion d'honneur in 1839. 
He was standing next to Louis Philippe I during Giuseppe Marco Fieschi's assassination attempt and was wounded by Fieschi's gun. He died in 1853.

Coat of arms
D'or, à la couleuvre ondoyante en pal d'azur surmontée d'un lambel du second; au canton des Barons militaires de l'Empire brochant.

References

Sources 
  Marie-Nicolas Bouillet and Alexis Chassang (ed.), "Pierre David de Colbert-Chabanais" in Dictionnaire universel d’histoire et de géographie, 1878
  "Pierre David de Colbert-Chabanais", in Charles Mullié, Biographie des célébrités militaires des armées de terre et de mer de 1789 à 1850, 1852
  P Louis Lainé, Archives généalogiques et historiques de la noblesse de France, ou, Recueil de preuves, mémoires et notices généalogiques, servant à constater l'origine, la filiation, les alliances et lés illustrations religieuses, civiles et militaires de diverses maisons et familles nobles du royaume, 1830;
http://www.napoleon-series.org/research/commanders/c_colbert.html
http://www.virtualarc.com/officers/colbert1/

1774 births
1853 deaths
French commanders of the Napoleonic Wars
French military personnel of the French Revolutionary Wars
Commanders in the French Imperial Guard
Peers of France
Grand Croix of the Légion d'honneur
Names inscribed under the Arc de Triomphe